Charles Vandeleur Creagh  (4 October 1842 – 18 September 1917) was Governor of North Borneo from 1888 to 1895.

Career
Creagh was educated at the Royal Naval School, New Cross and  Eastman’s Royal Naval Academy at Southsea. He was a barrister at the Middle Temple.

Creagh spent many years in government service in Hong Kong and is recorded as Acting Captain Superintendent of Police in 1867.

He posted as the Assistant Resident of Perak, Governor of North Borneo (1888–1895) and Governor and Commander-in-Chief, Labuan (1891–1895).

Personal life
Charles Vandeleur Creagh was the second son of Captain John Creagh, RN of Cahirbane Co. Clare, Ireland.  His younger brother became General O'Moore Creagh VC GCB GCSI (1848–1923).

Creagh married Blanche Frances Edwardes (1858–1948), daughter of Captain Frederick Augustus Edwardes (1829–1878) of Rhyd-y-gors in June 1882. Their elder son became Rear-Admiral James Vandeleur Creagh DSO (1883–1956). Their younger son went on to become Second Lieutenant O'Moore Charles Creagh (1896–1918) of the Royal Field Artillery, who was killed in action during the German Spring Offensive at Feuillaucourt, near Mont Saint-Quentin, on 23 March 1918, aged 21. They also had a daughter Dorothy Creagh.

Contributions
He donated his collection of Bornean plants to Kew Gardens.

Honours and legacy
He was made a CMG in 1890. The Bauhinia Creaghi Baker, a Caesalpiniaceae family plant species, was named after him as was the Creagh Road in Taiping.

Sources
Victor Plarr, Men and Women of the Time: A Dictionary of Contemporaries, 1899
Edmund Burke, The Annual Register, 1918
Ray Desmond, Dictionary of British and Irish Botanists and Horticulturists: Including Plant Collectors, Flower Painters and Garden Designers, 1977
Bauhinia Creaghi Baker

References

1842 births
1917 deaths
Administrators in British Malaya
Administrators in British Borneo
Governors of North Borneo
Companions of the Order of St Michael and St George
People educated at Eastman's Royal Naval Academy